Barchalla Assembly constituency is one of the 126 assembly constituencies of Assam Legislative Assembly. Ganesh Kumar Limbu is the current MLA of 72 No. Barchalla LAC. Barchalla forms part of the Tezpur Lok Sabha constituency.

Town Details

Country: India.
 State: Assam.
 District: Sonitpur district.
 Lok Sabha Constituency: Tezpur Lok Sabha/Parliamentary constituency.
 Assembly Categorisation: Rural
 Literacy Level: 81.66%.
 Eligible Electors as per 2021 General Elections:  1,73,433. Eligible Electors. Male Electors:88,869. Female Electors:84,560.
 Geographic Co-Ordinates:  26°37'53.0"N 92°27'24.5"E.
 Total Area Covered: 713 square kilometres.
 Area Includes:Barchalla and Borgaon mouzas in Dhekiajuli thana and Bihaguri and Bahbari (Part) mouzas in Tezpur thana, in Tezpur sub-division of  Sonitpur district of Assam.
 Inter State Border :Sonitpur.
 Number Of Polling Stations: Year 2011–192,Year 2016–196,Year 2021–72.

Members of Legislative Assembly

Following is the list of elected members to State Assembly:

 1978: Kamal Chandra Basumatari, PTC.
 1985: Prafulla Goswami, Independent.
 1991: Rudra Parajuli, Indian National Congress.
 1996: Prafulla Goswami, AGP.
 2001: Tanka Bahadur Rai, Indian National Congress.
 2006: Tanka Bahadur Rai, Indian National Congress.
 2016: Ganesh Kumar Limbu, BJP.
 2021: Ganesh Kumar Limbu, BJP.

See also
 Abhayapuri
 List of constituencies of Assam Legislative Assembly

References

External links 
 

Assembly constituencies of Assam